"I Have a Dream" and "Bellissima" are two tracks by German-Turkish DJ and music producer DJ Quicksilver. The songs were released as a double A-side single in November 1996 from his 1997 album Quicksilver.

The double single "I Have a Dream" / "Bellissima" was DJ Quicksilver's biggest chart success, reaching the top 10 in six countries. It was produced by Tommaso De Donatis and Orhan Terzi (DJ Quicksilver). It is certified gold in both Germany and the United Kingdom.

Content
The song "I Have a Dream" samples Martin Luther King Jr.'s 1963 "I Have a Dream" speech, and uses excerpts of King's voice.

Critical reception
A reviewer from Music Week wrote, "The Turkish-born DJ serves up a floor-packing, monster slice of uplifting house crammed with big beats and teasing drum rolls."

Music videos
The music videos of "I Have a Dream" and "Bellissima" were directed by Volker Hannwacker.

Charts

"I Have a Dream" / "Bellissima"

"I Have a Dream"

"Bellissima"

Year-end charts

Certifications

References

1996 singles
1997 singles
1997 songs
Electronic songs
Music videos directed by Volker Hannwacker
Song articles with missing songwriters
Number-one singles in Scotland